Ralf Rafael Gyllenhammar (born Rafael Wolfgang Sebek; 1 July 1966) is a Swedish musician. He is vocalist/guitarist of the rock band Mustasch and was also the frontman of B-Thong with whom he released one album, From Strength to Strength in 1997, shortly before the band's breakup. 

In 2007, his work with Klipptoppen earned him an award as the best "Alternative Presenter of the Year". Gyllenhammar was also one of several guest artists on the double disc soundtrack for the Swedish drama series Upp Till Kamp. Currently Gyllenhammar is endorsed by Schecter guitars which he tunes to drop C tuning and Blackstar Amplification.

Melodifestivalen
Gyllenhammar took part in Melodifestivalen 2013 with the song "Bed on Fire", in a bid to represent Sweden in the Eurovision Song Contest 2013. He sang in the semi-final 4 held on 23 February 2013 and came 1st/2nd, thus qualifying directly to the final on 9 March 2013. The song is co-written by him and David Wilhelmsson.

Discography 

Studio albums

Solo singles

With Mustasch
(Selective albums and EPs)
2001: The True Sound of the New West (EP)
2002: Above All
2003: Ratsafari
2005: Powerhouse
2006: Parasite! (EP)
2007: Latest Version of the Truth
2008: Lowlife Highlights (compilation)
2011: The New Sound of the True Best (compilation; old tracks re-recorded)
2012: Sounds Like Hell Looks Like Heaven
2014: Thank You for the Demon
2015: Testosterone

References

External links 

 
 

1966 births
20th-century Swedish male musicians
20th-century Swedish male singers
21st-century Swedish male singers
Swedish male singer-songwriters
Swedish multi-instrumentalists
Swedish rock guitarists
Swedish rock singers
Living people
Musicians from Gothenburg
Melodifestivalen contestants of 2021
Melodifestivalen contestants of 2013